German submarine U-4706 was a Type XXIII U-boat of Nazi Germany's Kriegsmarine during World War II. She was ordered on 7 July 1944, and was laid down on 14 November 1944 at Friedrich Krupp Germaniawerft AG, Kiel, as yard number 948. She was launched on 19 January 1945 and commissioned under the command of Oberleutnant zur See Manfred Schneider on 7 February 1945.

Design
Like all Type XXIII U-boats, U-4706 had a displacement of  when at the surface and  while submerged. The submarine was powered by one MWM six-cylinder RS134S diesel engine providing , one AEG GU4463-8 double-acting electric motor electric motor providing , and one BBC silent running CCR188 electric motor providing .

U-4706 was fitted with two  torpedo tubes in the bow. She could carry two preloaded torpedoes. The complement was 14–18 men. This class of U-boat did not carry a deck gun.

Service history
On 9 May 1945, U-4706 surrendered at Kristiansand, Norway.

Post war service
In October 1948, U-4706 was transferred to Norway, and the Royal Norwegian Navy quickly gave her the impromptu name HNoMS Knerten ("the runt") in reference to her diminutive size relative to the three Type VIIC/41 boats that were acquired at the same time. Knerten was briefly homeported in Trondheim in 1949, slated to be used as a development testbed for air-independent propulsion technology, but a lack of spare parts and a battery explosion accident prevented her from ever being entered into service.
 From 14 April 1950, the Royal Norwegian Yacht Club used her for storage until she was struck in 1954 and broken up.

See also
 Battle of the Atlantic

References

Bibliography

External links

U-boats commissioned in 1945
World War II submarines of Germany
1945 ships
Type XXIII submarines
Ships built in Kiel
Submarines of the Royal Norwegian Navy